Call of Duty: Ghosts is a 2013 first-person shooter video game developed by Infinity Ward and published by Activision. It is the tenth major installment in the Call of Duty series and the sixth developed by Infinity Ward. It was released for Microsoft Windows, PlayStation 3, Xbox 360, and Wii U on November 5, 2013. The game was released with the launch of the PlayStation 4 and Xbox One.

Ghosts received generally mixed reviews from critics, with most praising its multiplayer gameplay and introduction of the new game mode Extinction, but criticizing it for its single-player campaign, rehashing of familiar concepts, and general lack of innovation.

Gameplay

Campaign
In Call of Duty: Ghosts, the story is mostly told through the eyes of Logan Walker, with several other playable characters, including an astronaut specialist named Baker; Sergeant Thompson; Elias Walker, member of Icarus and Logan's father; and the newer option to play as a German Shepherd, Riley, the first non-human playable character in the franchise.

Multiplayer
The multiplayer mode in Call of Duty: Ghosts features changes from previous Call of Duty games as some new mechanics have been added to it. Maps now have areas that can be altered or destroyed. There is a nuke-like kill streak reward, the KEM Strike. The player can get the ODIN kill streak by either getting a certain amount of kills or by killing the top player on the other team and then completing various challenges after picking up a blue briefcase that is dropped. The sniper rifle scopes also have new "dual render technology" allowing the player to see around the outside of the scope (although blurred) when zoomed in. On October 3, a new multiplayer type was revealed, called Squads. This features a squad that the player can build and the player can face other squads around the world. The player's squad can be leveled up and will act like a true individual. "Octane", "Prison Break", "Tremor", "Freight", "Stormfront", "Siege", "Warhawk", "Sovereign", "Overlord", "Flooded", "Strikezone", "Whiteout", "Stonehaven" and "Chasm" are the maps that are in Call of Duty: Ghosts so far. The dynamic map, "Free Fall", was a pre-order bonus. The game now features playable female soldiers.

Squads
Call of Duty: Ghosts introduces a new game type called Squads. This mode can be played either solo or with other players including friends. A squad consists of ten different customizable characters. Squads can be utilized in unique gamemodes involving AI controlled enemies and AI controlled squad mates. The gamemodes include Squad Assault, Safeguard, Safeguard Infinite, Squad vs Squad, and Wargame. All of these modes can be played while online or offline.

 Squad vs Squad: Two opposing players play team deathmatch using their Squads. 
 Wargame: The player and five squad mates against a team of enemy bots in a mode.
 Safeguard: The player and up to three other friends in a wave-based survival match similar to Survival Mode from Call of Duty: Modern Warfare 3, but with the addition of perks and scorestreaks.

Multiplayer game modes
Call of Duty: Ghosts features several staple multiplayer game modes, while introducing several new game types, including:

 Search and Rescue: A take on Search & Destroy, but rather than having a single life per round, in Search & Rescue a player's team can revive them. It combines that teamwork and communication from Kill Confirmed with the objective-based cooperation of Search & Destroy.
 Gun Game: Similar to versions in previous games, the player starts with a pistol and continues to gain a new weapon for each player they kill. The match ends when a player cycles through all of the available weapons.
 Cranked: In this team-based game mode, the first team to earn 100 kills wins. Once a player kills an enemy, becoming "Cranked," the player who earned the kill has 30 seconds to earn a subsequent kill. If they do not earn a subsequent kill within 30 seconds, they blow up. The detonation does not harm teammates or enemies. If a player earns a subsequent kill within 30 seconds, the timer resets to 30 seconds and the kill counts for two points instead of one. Once a player is "Cranked" their movement speed is increased, they throw grenades more rapidly, and they aim down sight more quickly, among other effects.
 Free For All: The classic gamemode from previous installments in the franchise returns, in which players must rack up a total of 30 kills to win the game against seven other opponents or rack up to most kills in a 10-minute time limit.
 Team Deathmatch: Team Deathmatch returns in Call of Duty: Ghosts: two teams, 10 minutes, 75 kill limit.
 Search and Destroy: A gamemode in which one side has five minutes to plant a bomb at a choice of two sites and the other team is tasked with defending the sites, the catch of this mode is there are no respawns and the game ends once one team wins four rounds.
 Domination: A gamemode where three flags are scattered throughout the map for players to take and control. Every five seconds a flag in controlled will gain a player's team a point, if a player's team controls two or three flags, they gain two or three points. The first team to 200 points wins.
 Team Tactical: A mixture of objective games involving four on four matches.
 Kill Confirmed: A gamemode in which two teams battle, similar to TDM, with the catch being that when a player kills an enemy they drop a dog tag, which is worth points when collected. If a player collects a fallen teammate's dog tag, no points are award to the enemy team; first team to 100 points wins the game.
 Infected: Similar to the mode in Modern Warfare 3, one player is randomly infected at the beginning and can infect other players until either all survivors are infected, or time runs out. Playlists will rotate between several different scenarios involving various loadouts. This mode allows up to 18 players on Xbox One, PlayStation 4, and PC versions and up to 12 players on the other platforms.

 Blitz: This team-based game mode is similar to Capture the Flag in that the player needs to go to a portal located at the enemy's spawn point while preventing players from the enemy team from reaching theirs. These portals are temporarily closed for 10 seconds when they are captured to prevent players from rushing.
 Hunted Free for All: Players start with a pistol, two throwing knives, and a flashbang. Crates are dropped in random locations throughout the match that contains more weapons and ammo for the players to compete for. The game mode has a 25-kill limit.
 Ground War: Containing a rotating playlist with Domination and Team Deathmatch, but with 12-18 players and a 100-kill limit for TDM. This mode is only available for the Xbox One, PlayStation 4, and PC versions of the game.
 Drop Zone: Teams take turns capturing drop zones for points. For every 15 seconds a player holds down the objective, a care package will drop.

Extinction
Extinction is a 4-player co-op mode, which pits the player(s) against various types of aliens (known altogether as Cryptids) in a base-defending survival style map. The main goal is usually to destroy all of the Cryptid hives scattered across the map (with the exception of Awakening and Exodus; the former requires players scanning for obelisks in an area which need to be destroyed, while Exodus features generators which the players have to activate). Players choose from four different class types, with unique traits and customizable loadouts. The player(s) can level up their classes, unlocking more weapons and equipment for their loadouts. This mode is unlocked by finishing the first level of the Campaign.

The first map, "Point of Contact", is included within the base game, and serves as an introduction to the game mode. The map takes place in an abandoned city in Colorado, two weeks after the events of the campaign mission "Ghost Stories".

The second map, "Nightfall", is released as part of the Onslaught DLC pack, and is advertised as the first of the four episodic contents for Extinction. The map takes place in an Alaskan research facility, 14 weeks after "Point of Contact", and introduces two characters central to the story: Dr. Samantha Cross and Cpt. David Archer. The map also introduces two new types of Cryptid aliens, one of which (the Breeder) serves as a boss-type enemy. Players are also given access to a mysterious and powerful weapon: The Venom X. Players can unlock several pieces of intel, revealing details about the story revolving around Cross and Archer.

The third map, "Mayday", is released as part of the Devastation DLC pack, and is the second of four episodes of Extinction. The map takes place on board a Naval ship, 26 days after the events in "Nightfall", and introduces two more new types of Cryptids: The Seeder (Which looks like the red seekers) but is bright orange and spawns' plantlike turrets that shoot projectiles at the players, and the Kraken, the large, multi-tentacled boss at the end of the chapter. In addition to weapons scattered throughout the ship, players can access schematics to build powerful offensive and defensive weapons, including 4 variations of the Venom X from the previous chapter. Players can also find intel as well to learn more about the story of Extinction.

The fourth map, "Awakening", which is released as part of the Invasion DLC pack, is advertised as the third episode. The map takes place in an underground Cryptid hive, 36 hours after "Mayday", and introduces three new types of Cryptids: the flying Gargoyle, the explosive Bomber, and the powerful Mammoth. The Cryptids' masters, the Ancestors, are also seen in the map. The players have access to ARK attachments, which turn weapons into laser weapons, greatly increasing their power. As with the previous two maps, intels can be found to discover more information regarding the story.

The final map, "Exodus", which also acts as the final episode of Extinction, is released as part of the Nemesis DLC pack. The map takes place in a launch facility, 3 months after "Awakening", where the players are pit in a final battle against the forces of the Cryptids. Nearly every Cryptid type is encountered in the map, including the Ancestors. Players can choose their own paths in progressing throughout the map. The map also introduces two brand new weapons, the NX-1 Disruptor and the NX-1 Grenades, which are required in taking out the Ancestors.

Plot

Campaign

Setting and characters
Call of Duty: Ghosts is set in the near future that follows the nuclear destruction of the Middle East. The oil-producing nations of Latin America form the Federation of the Americas in response to the ensuing global economic crisis and quickly grow into a global superpower, swiftly invading and conquering Central America, the Caribbean, and Mexico.

The game's main protagonists are the Ghosts, a force of U.S. Special Operations personnel trained to conduct clandestine missions behind enemy lines. The unit is led by retired U.S. Army Captain Elias Walker (Stephen Lang). He is joined by his sons Logan and David "Hesh" Walker (Brandon Routh), along with a trained German Shepherd named Riley, Captain Thomas A. Merrick (Jeffrey Pierce), and Gunnery Sergeant Keegan P. Russ (Brian Bloom).

The game's main antagonist is Gabriel T. Rorke (Kevin Gage), the former leader of the Ghosts who works for the Federation after being captured and brainwashed by the Federation via torture and hallucinogens.

Story
In 2017, U.S. Army officer Elias Walker tells his teenage sons Hesh and Logan the legend of how the Ghosts, an elite coalition of all U.S. Special Operations units, first appeared. Meanwhile, in space, the Federation of the Americas hijack the Orbital Defense Initiative (ODIN), an orbital superweapon that consists of a network of satellites that utilize kinetic bombardment. The Federation uses it to destroy several cities in the southwestern United States. U.S. Air Force astronauts Baker and Mosley sacrifice themselves to self-destruct the space station and prevent ODIN from launching other payloads further inland. The Walker family narrowly escapes the destruction of San Diego.

Ten years later, the war between the United States and the Federation has been a bloody stalemate along a front that comprises the destroyed cities (known as "No Man's Land"), which has become a war of attrition as more Federation forces attempt to break the frontlines. However, the U.S. stands its ground, fighting near the former United States-Mexico border. Hesh and Logan are part of an Army special unit under the command of Elias and are accompanied by Riley, their loyal military-trained German Shepherd. During a mission into No Man's Land, they spot Federation agent Gabriel Rorke interrogating Ghost member Ajax. The brothers meet and join Ghost members Thomas Merrick and Keegan Russ in an attempt to rescue Ajax, but he is killed.

The brothers return to Santa Monica, California, where U.S. Armed Forces hold out against a Federation assault, and reunite with their father, who reveals himself as the leader of the Ghosts. Recruiting his sons into the Ghosts, Elias tells them about how Rorke was the Ghosts' previous commanding officer until Elias was forced to abandon him during a successful mission in Caracas to assassinate a former Federation leader. The Federation captured and brainwashed Rorke and is now using him to hunt down the Ghosts.

The Ghosts assault Rorke's base and capture him, but Federation forces destroy their plane and rescue him. The team lands in the Yucatán Peninsula, where they witness the launch of a mysterious Federation missile. The Ghosts infiltrate a Federation base and discover plans to create a new superweapon. Constructing a counterattack, the Ghosts make significant gains against the Federation by destroying their Atlas oil platform in Antarctica and sinking a destroyer guarding a Federation factory in the port of Rio de Janeiro. The team then breaks into the factory and discovers that the Federation reverse-engineered ODIN into their own orbital bombardment system named LOKI.

After destroying the factory, the Ghosts regroup at a safe house in Las Vegas, but are captured by Rorke, who executes Elias. In a last-ditch effort, the U.S. Navy pools all its remaining forces, including its last aircraft carrier USS Liberator, in a synchronized all-out assault. Hesh and Logan launch a missile to destroy the Federation space center in the Atacama Desert, while forces in U.S. Space Force take over the Federation space station. They seize control of LOKI and decimate the Federation forces by turning their weapons on them. Hesh and Logan then disobey Merrick's orders and pursue Rorke to avenge their father. Despite being shot by Logan and left to drown, Rorke survives and captures Logan, wanting to brainwash him into becoming a Federation agent.

In a post-credits scene, Logan is seen inside a caged pit in the jungle, presumably going through the same torture methods as Rorke.

Extinction

Setting and characters
The Extinction story takes place in an alternate reality following the events of the first mission of the Ghosts campaign, where the ODIN strike unearths ancient creatures known as Cryptids upon mankind. The player takes on the role of an elite unnamed soldier, whose appearance is carried from the player's multiplayer character. The story revolves mainly around two central characters: Doctor Samantha Cross (Ali Hillis), a researcher of the Nightfall Program who was studying Cryptid origins; and Captain David Archer (Dave B. Mitchell), leader of the Nightfall Program.

Story
Following the Federation's attack on ODIN Station and the strike that decimated a large portion of the United States, a stray missile hit Caldera Peak, Colorado, revealing a colony of ancient creatures called Cryptids lying dormant below it. The Cryptids' masters, the Ancestors, seized the opportunity by commanding them to awake, massacre the town, and destroy everything in their path. In order to contain the outbreak, a Task Force codenamed Specter was sent in to exterminate the Cryptids' presence. Though they were successful, remains of the Cryptids were collected by Nightfall, a research program dedicated to uncovering the origins of the creatures. The program's leader, Captain David Archer, implemented covert operations to breed Cryptids for experimentation, as well as deciphering of glyphs found within several sites where Nightfall was researching on Cryptid appearance. However, one of the doctors working at Nightfall, Samantha Cross, began to fall under the Ancestors' influence, and slowly became one of their hypnotic spies, capable of telepathic abilities. She caused an outbreak at the Nightfall facility, killing all members within it, except herself and Archer. An elite squad named CIF Team One was dispatched to help Archer and Cross escape, but Archer secretly snuck away on a destroyer vessel supplied by one of his mysterious contacts, in order to arrive at another Cryptid site.

For the following three weeks, Archer would experiment on Cross in order to learn of her abilities, realizing that she is capable of taming the Cryptids. Using her as a beacon, Archer guided the destroyer toward the remaining Cryptid Arks around the world. Cross fell into the Ancestors' control even more, and upon full possession, she began to summon the Ark's guardian, the Kraken, to protect the Cryptid colony and kill Archer and everyone aboard the destroyer. CIF Team One was sent in once again to rescue Archer, as well as eliminate Cross, per the deal between Archer and CIF Team One's handler, General "Godfather" Castle. However, Cross evaded their attempts to kill her and wound up in the Cryptid Ark. Archer and his men later arrived at the island where the Ark is located, however they encounter hordes of Cryptids, leading to Archer's hand being infected. Cross arrived and amputated his hand, then forged a temporary alliance with him, as she attempted to explain the Ancestors' true motives, and her reasons for not siding with them. CIF Team One was later dispatched by Castle to find Archer as well as retrieve the Cortex, a device containing tissue samples of an Ancestor's brain. The team succeeded in finding the Cortex, and Cross was extracted from the Ark, while Archer was left to die.

While on their way back to the United States, CIF Team One was attacked by Cryptid forces, and was stranded in the heart of the outbreak, while Cross escaped captivity. For the next three months, Cryptids would begin to overrun all military centers of the US, leaving General Castle as the leader of the surviving remnants of the country. He came in contact with CIF Team One, and ordered them to protect the Exodus launch site, allowing the remnants to escape Earth into outer space, away from the Cryptids' influence. In the midst of the operation, Cross regained contact with the survivors, reasoning CIF Team One must sacrifice themselves to activate the Medusa, a psionic weapon capable of eradicating all Cryptids within a three-mile radius, and give mankind a chance to overcome extinction. In a final order, General Castle commanded his men to defeat the oncoming Cryptid siege led by the Ancestors themselves. Now in safe passage to the space station, Cross acknowledged that her otherworldly powers were key in humanity's future retaliation, agreeing to be placed in a replica Beacon Amplifier to harness her gifts to benefit the future descendants of the Exodus program.

Development
On February 7, 2013, Activision confirmed that a new Call of Duty game was in development and would be released Q4, 2013. The publisher expected to sell fewer copies than the series' previous entry, Call of Duty: Black Ops II on seventh generation consoles (PlayStation 3 and Xbox 360) due to the transition to next-generation consoles.

The series starts a new subseries with Ghosts to coincide with Sony and Microsoft's eighth generation consoles entering the market. The game was supposed to debut an engine built by the developer, originally described as a new engine, but later clarified to be the same engine as used in previous games with "significant" upgrades. The game also utilized Umbra Software's rendering tool, Umbra 3, as a way to speed up the rendering process of large environments by an optimization known as occlusion culling – a method of filtering out hidden objects so they are not rendered.

The Wii U version of the game was developed by Treyarch.

Infinity Ward prioritized frame rate over display resolution during the development of Call of Duty: Ghosts, with the game targeted to run at 60 frames per second on each platform. While the game outputs at 1080p on PlayStation 4, the Xbox One can only manage 720p while maintaining the frame rate. Due to a "configuration issue" however, the PlayStation 4 version still required a release day patch to reach 1080p.

Audio
David Buckley scored the game's original soundtrack. Rapper Eminem's 2013 song "Survival" is featured as the game's credit song.

Marketing and release

Reveal
On April 29, 2013, the official Call of Duty website was updated with a social media mosaic that filled up every time a user logged into the site via Twitter or Facebook. The next day, the mosaic was completed and the picture showed a skull along the text "the Ghosts are real." Some details about Ghosts leaked prior, especially when Tesco pulled the listing of the game for the PlayStation 3 after it was put up accidentally. Several other retailers, including Target, listed it for PlayStation 3 and Xbox 360. The live-action teaser trailer for Ghosts, titled "Masked Warriors", features glimpses of people wearing historical battle masks, among them one of a group of soldiers putting on the skull mask shown on the box art. It was released on May 1, 2013. Ghosts appeared at the "Xbox Reveal" event on May 21, 2013. During E3 2013 the PlayStation 4 and Xbox One versions were promoted, and the Wii U version was confirmed towards the end of the event on June 13.

On August 14, 2013, American rapper Eminem's "Survival" featuring Liz Rodrigues, with production by DJ Khalil was premiered in the multiplayer trailer for the game. The music video for the song features various footage from the game's single player campaign, and other elements from the game.

Release
Call of Duty: Ghosts was released for Microsoft Windows and current-generation game consoles – PlayStation 3, Xbox 360, and Wii U – on November 5, 2013. Activision announced that the game would be available for the PlayStation 4 and Xbox One in time for each console's release date on November 15, 2013, and November 22, 2013, respectively. Despite the official announcement for next-generation systems, the PlayStation 4 version of the game was made available by some retailers ahead of the scheduled release date.

Downloadable content

Downloadable content (DLC) for Ghosts has been released. Pre-ordered versions of the game included a bonus "dynamic" map called Free Fall and also got Simon "Ghost" Riley and John "Soap" MacTavish from Modern Warfare 2 as playable multiplayer characters. However, Free Fall was excluded from the Wii U pre-ordered version, which was later released on the Wii U on March 4, 2014.

Four sets of DLC map packs were released in 2014. A Season Pass is available, which gives players immediate access to all four DLC packs.

The first map pack, Onslaught, was released for the Xbox 360 and Xbox One on January 28, 2014, and for Windows, PlayStation 3, and PlayStation 4 on February 27, 2014. It contains an exclusive playlist for owners of the DLC. The DLC pack brings in 4 new multiplayer maps: "Fog", "Bayview", "Ignition", and "Containment". The map Ignition is a re-make of Scrapyard from Modern Warfare 2. It also includes two new multiplayer weapons: the Maverick assault rifle, and the Maverick A-2 sniper rifle; as well as "Nightfall", the first of the four Extinction episodic contents. On the multiplayer map Fog, Michael Myers from the Halloween film series appears as a playable character, obtainable by earning a care package by completing various challenges via Field Orders.

The second map pack, Devastation, was released on the Xbox 360 and Xbox One on April 3, 2014, and on Windows, PlayStation 3, and PlayStation 4 on May 8, 2014. It contains an exclusive playlist for owners of the DLC. The pack introduces four new multiplayer maps: "Ruins", "Behemoth", "Collision", and "Unearthed". The map Unearthed is a re-make of the fan-favorite map Dome from Modern Warfare 3. It includes a new hybrid multiplayer weapon called the Ripper, which Season Pass owners received early. On the map "Ruins", Predator from the Predator film series appears as a playable character. Additionally, it includes the next installment in the Extinction episodic contents, titled "Mayday".

The third map pack, Invasion, was released on the Xbox 360 and Xbox One on June 3, 2014, and on Windows, PlayStation 3, and PlayStation 4 on July 3, 2014. It contains an exclusive playlist for owners of the DLC. The pack introduces four new multiplayer maps: "Pharaoh", "Departed", "Mutiny", and "Favela", a re-make of the fan-favorite map of the same name from "Modern Warfare 2". It includes the third Extinction episodic content, titled "Awakening".

The final map pack, Nemesis, was released on the Xbox 360 and Xbox One on August 5, 2014, and on Windows, PlayStation 3, and PlayStation 4 on September 4, 2014. It contains an exclusive playlist for owners of the DLC. The pack introduces four new multiplayer maps: "Goldrush", "Subzero", "Dynasty", and a reimagined version of the map "Shipment" from Call of Duty 4: Modern Warfare, "Showtime". It includes the final Extinction episode, titled "Exodus".

Additional downloadable content includes Announcer Packs of Snoop Dogg and the Drill Instructor featuring R. Lee Ermey (who starred in Full Metal Jacket), Personalization Packs, Legend Packs and Special Characters.

Reception

Critical response
Call of Duty: Ghosts received both "mixed or average" and "generally favorable" reviews, according to review aggregator Metacritic. IGN praised the sequel for introducing "sweeping changes that breathe new life into the multiplayer experience" and called the campaign "lengthy, challenging, and varied". GameSpot went even further regarding the campaign, calling it "impressive" and "a terrific collection of shootouts and set pieces". Both also welcomed the new character customization feature and game types in multiplayer, particularly Extinction which was called "tremendous fun" and "an interesting strategic dynamic".

Conversely, PC Gamer dubbed the campaign as "exciting but only passively entertaining" and criticized the "whack-a-mole" feel in the game's multiplayer. VideoGamer.com praised overall gameplay, saying it "seems more refined and enjoyable than Black Ops 2" but criticized the campaign calling it a "po-faced, nonsensical rehash of greatest hits long past". Eurogamer was less critical of the campaign, commenting that "the Ghosts campaign can't help but feel like a step backwards", but that "it's still capable of being devilishly entertaining" and "moment-to-moment thrills are still there, if muted by expectation". Joystiq disparaged both types of gameplay, saying "It layers a fresh coat of paint over a tired design document; a document that brings players down a rote campaign path before landing them in a multiplayer mode that abandons many of the creative advancements seen in Black Ops 2".

Sales
Despite shipping $1 billion worth of units to retail channels within 24 hours of the game's launch, overall sales were down compared to 2012's Call of Duty: Black Ops II. Activision blamed the fall in demand on uncertainty caused by the upcoming transition to eighth generation consoles. As of February 2014, the game has sold over 19 million copies in physical retail.

References
Notes

Footnotes

External links

2013 video games
Fiction about aerial warfare
Ghosts
Cooperative video games
Dystopian video games
Video games about siblings
First-person shooters
Multiplayer and single-player video games
Nintendo Network games
PlayStation 3 games
PlayStation 4 games
Post-apocalyptic video games
Split-screen multiplayer games
Square Enix games
Video games developed in the United States
Video games set in Alaska
Video games set in Antarctica
Video games set in Australia
Video games set in Argentina
Video games set in Brazil
Video games set in California
Video games set in San Diego
Video games set in Los Angeles
Video games set in the Las Vegas Valley
Video games set in Canada
Video games set in Chile
Video games set in China
Video games set in Colombia
Video games set in Colorado
Video games set in Egypt
Video games set in Florida
Video games set in Mexico
Video games set in Nevada
Video games set in New York City
Video games set in Scotland
Video games set in Venezuela
Video games set in Washington (state)
Video games set in Uruguay
Video games set in the Caribbean
Video games set in a fictional country
Video games set in outer space
Video games using PhysX
Wii U games
Windows games
Xbox 360 games
Xbox One games
Video games set in the 2020s
Fiction set in 2027
Alien invasions in video games
Video games set in 2017
Science fiction video games
Video games set in 2015
War video games set in the United States
Fiction about mind control
Science fiction shooter video games
Video games using Havok
Military science fiction video games
Video games about dogs
Weapons of mass destruction in fiction
Treyarch games
Infinity Ward games